Édouard Jasmin (1905 1987) was a Québécois artist, known for his ceramic platters in which he sought to capture scenes of modern Quebec.

Career
Édouard Jasmin was born in Saint-Laurent (today part of Montreal). He left school early to work at different art-related jobs since he was talented in that area. From 1923 to 1933, he ran an import business, then opened a restaurant in the basement of his home on rue Saint-Denis, Montreal, then got a job as a handyman and from 1960-1976, at the Service des parcs de la ville de Montréal. In his restaurant he started to paint, decorating the walls and furniture and also drawing and painting independently. He also began to work with clay and, upon retirement, created small narrative murals on large platters for which he became known.
 
In a 1985 interview, Jasmin said:
I always try to find the amusing, the pleasant side of life….So I like to create fantasies and oddities, sometimes exaggerated, and if they make people laugh, then I too am happy.

Jasmin died in Montreal in 1987. His fonds is in the National Archives in Montreal.

Selected public collections and exhibitions
Jasmin's ceramic work is in the collection of the Art Gallery of Nova Scotia; the Canadian Museum of History; the Museum of Fine Arts, Houston; and other institutions.

In 2022, the Art Gallery of Nova Scotia, one of the main repositories of Canadian folk art along with the Canadian Museum of History, included 16 of Jasmin's platters which it had recently purchased in a show titled Folk/Funk.

References

Artists from Montreal
people from Saint-Laurent, Quebec
20th-century Canadian painters
Canadian male painters
Outsider artists
1905 births
1987 deaths
20th-century Canadian male artists